Beerze is a hamlet in the Dutch province of Overijssel. It is a part of the municipality of Ommen, and lies about 20 km north of Almelo.

It was first mentioned between 1381 and 1383 as "to Beersen", a means "hedged area". In 1840, it was home to 154 people.

References

Populated places in Overijssel
Ommen